Frank Beck may refer to:

 Frank Beck (baseball) (1860–1941), American baseball player
 Frank Beck (British Army officer) (1861–1915)
 Frank Beck (computer scientist) (1930–2020), British computer scientist
 Frank Beck (sex offender) (1942–1994), English child sex offender
 Frank Beck (fencer) (born 1961), German Olympic fencer
 Frank Ver Beck (1858–1933), American illustrator